Put Your Back N 2 It is the second album by American musician Perfume Genius, released on February 21, 2012.

Track listing

References

2012 albums
Perfume Genius albums
Matador Records albums